Eržvilkas (Samogitian: Eržvėlks) is a town in Taurage County, Lithuania. According to the 2011 census, the town has a population of 429 people.

History

Jewish history
Before World War II and the Holocaust, the village had an important Jewish community. In 1923, they were 46% of the total population.

Among others, Hermann Schapira (1840-1898), a mathematician and important forerunner of the Zionist movement, was born in the village.

At the beginning of the Second World War there were 180 Jews living in the village.

In 1941 these Jews were exploited as forced labour. In September 1941, they were murdered in mass executions perpetrated by an Einsatzgruppen of Lithuanian policemen at the Gryblaukis forest.

References

Towns in Lithuania
Towns in Tauragė County
Rossiyensky Uyezd
Holocaust locations in Lithuania